More Than Blue is a 2009 South Korean film. The directorial debut of poet Won Tae-yeon, it stars Kwon Sang-woo, Lee Bo-young and Lee Beom-soo in the lead roles. The film's Korean title translates as "A Story Sadder Than Sadness". In 2018, a Taiwanese remake of the same name was released. Later, in 2021 a Taiwanese remake was released on Netflix into a ten-episode series More than Blue: The Series.

Plot 
K and Cream first meet each other in high school & both are orphans; K was abandoned by his mother after his father died of cancer who nevertheless left him a sizeable sum of money, while Cream lost her entire family in a car accident. The two become soulmates and come to share a home. Knowing that Cream's biggest fear is to be left alone, K keeps the fact that he has leukemia ,and instead he urges her to marry a kind and healthy man. When Cream announces that she is in love with affluent dentist , K is left heartbroken, but is satisfied that she has met her ideal partner.

Believing Cream has really found someone she loves, K asked Joo-hwan's fiancée to break up with him.  Joo-hwan's fiancée agrees under the condition that K lets her take photographs of him for her exhibit about death.  It is later revealed that Cream first learned about K's illness when she rummaged through his belongings to find what men liked for her new song,  but in fact turned out to be pain medication for terminal cancer patients. Earlier in the movie, Cream asked K what his wish was. It was for Cream to find a good and healthy man to spend her life with. With her knowledge of his illness, Cream thus faked falling in love with Joo-hwan, in order to appease K. This perspective of Cream's is revealed toward the end of the movie.

In the end, Cream apologizes to Joo-hwan for cheating him and finds K and lives with him till he died. Joo-hwan then visits their grave, implying Cream committed suicide after K's death.

Cast 
 Kwon Sang-woo as Kang Chul-gyu ("K")
 Lee Bo-young as Eun-won ("Cream")
 Lee Beom-soo as Cha Joo-hwan
 Jung Ae-yeon as Jenna
 Lee Han-wi as President Kim
 Shin Hyun-tak as Min-cheol
 Kim Jeong-seok as Organization manager
 Seon Ho-jin as DJ Sapami
 Park Yeong-jin as Handsome guy at guardhouse
 Jung Joon-ho as President Im
 Lee Seung-cheol as Singer A
 Ji Dae-han as Singer A's audio engineer
 Nam Gyu-ri as Catgirl
 Kim Heung-gook as Traffic broadcast DJ

Production 
More Than Blue marked the directorial debut of poet Won Tae-yeon, who also wrote the script. The film was made on a budget of just under US$2 million, with all three of the main cast members investing a portion of their salaries into the production. Lead actor Kwon Sang-woo drew inspiration from his own then-recent marriage, saying, "I think being married enables me to think more deeply about playing melodramatic parts... K braves his circumstances for love, and I thought I might have done the same if I were in his shoes".

Release 
More Than Blue was released in South Korea on 11 March 2009, and topped the domestic box office on its opening weekend with 256,809 admissions.

Critical response 
Lee Hyo-won of The Korea Times commented that despite its familiar premise, More Than Blue "feels more classic than clichéd and the undying fidelity of the love-struck characters nostalgically evokes old romances. The talented actors also bring freshness to their parts, making them very believable and worthy of every ounce of one's empathy." Kwon Sang-woo in particular was singled out for his performance, with Lee commenting, "Kwon wins the audience's heart by bringing a certain tenderness to his character, suggesting a maturation in his acting, a palpable break away from his previous roles as a romantic tough guy."

References

External links 
 
 
 

2009 films
2000s Korean-language films
South Korean romantic drama films
Showbox films
Films about cancer
Films about music and musicians
Films about orphans
2009 directorial debut films
2000s South Korean films